Streptomyces cuspidosporus is a bacterium species from the genus of Streptomyces which has been isolated from soil in Kyoto in Japan. Streptomyces cuspidosporus produces xylanase, sparsomycin and tubercidin.

See also 
 List of Streptomyces species

References

Further reading

External links
Type strain of Streptomyces cuspidosporus at BacDive -  the Bacterial Diversity Metadatabase

cuspidosporus
Bacteria described in 1961